Oliver Wainwright (born July 1984) is a British architecture and design critic. He has written for the British newspapers The Guardian and The Times and is the Features Editor for the industry magazine Building Design. He trained and worked as an architect before becoming a journalist

Oliver Wainwright studied architecture at the University of Cambridge, graduating with a double first, before the Royal College of Art.

As well as being a writer and journalist, Wainwright has collaborated on design projects with the Architecture Foundation and the National Building Museum, and has lectured at several British architecture schools. He is the son of former Guardian journalist Martin Wainwright.

Wainwright has praised the work of architect firm Stanton Williams and defended the company's design of the Sainsbury Laboratory after it won the 2012 RIBA Stirling Prize, despite its superficially prefabricated style. He has criticised the design of the Liverpool Museum, highlighting problems of being over budget and in his opinion too close to the Liverpool Maritime Mercantile City, at the time a UNESCO World Heritage Site. He described the restaurant in the Walkie Talkie tower at 20 Fenchurch Street as "like being in an airport terminal".

References

External links 

 Oliver Wainwright | The Guardian

1984 births
Living people
British male journalists
British architecture writers
The Guardian journalists
Alumni of the University of Cambridge
Alumni of the Royal College of Art
Architecture critics